Herojuana is a collaborative extended play by American horrorcore rappers Bang Belushi and King Gordy from underground hip hop group the Fat Killahz. 

The entire album has been recorded in six hours and produced by fellow Detroit producer Foul Mouth. The digital version released free on August 20, 2016. The duo have decided to put out a very limited run of a hundred hard copy albums available on October 30, 2016.

On August 14, 2016, they released a single for "Put It Out" via SoundCloud.

Track listing
All tracks written and composed by Bang Belushi and King Gordy

Personnel
Bang Belushi  – performer, composer
Foul Mouth – producer, recording, mixing
Jeff Milberg – artwork
Jimbo Slice – producer
King Gordy – composer, performer
Tone Rizzo – mastering

References

External links

2016 EPs
King Gordy albums